United Nations Security Council Resolution 86, adopted on September 26, 1950, having found that the Republic of Indonesia was a peace-loving State which fulfilled the conditions laid down in Article 4 of the United Nations Charter, the Council recommended that the UN General Assembly admit the Republic of Indonesia to membership in the United Nations.

The resolution was adopted with ten votes; the Republic of China abstained from voting.

See also
List of United Nations member states
List of United Nations Security Council Resolutions 1 to 100 (1946–1953)
United Nations General Assembly Resolution 491

References
Text of the Resolution at undocs.org

External links
 

 0086
Liberal democracy period in Indonesia
1950 in Indonesia
 0086
 0086
September 1950 events